In Greek mythology, Hipponome (Ancient Greek: Ἱππονόμης means "horse-keeper") was the daughter of Menoeceus from Thebes and thus sister of Creon and Jocasta. She married Alcaeus, son of Perseus and Andromeda, and had children by him, a son Amphitryon and two daughters Anaxo and Perimede. In other accounts, the wife of Alcaeus was named Astydamia, daughter of Pelops or Laonome, daughter of Guneus.

Mythology 
In Pseudo-Apollodorus' account of The Library, Hipponome was mentioned in the following passage:

 "Alcaeus had a son Amphitryon and a daughter Anaxo by Astydamia, daughter of Pelops; but some say he had them by Laonome, daughter of Guneus, others that he had them by Hipponome, daughter of Menoeceus"

Notes

References 

 Pausanias, Description of Greece with an English Translation by W.H.S. Jones, Litt.D., and H.A. Ormerod, M.A., in 4 Volumes. Cambridge, MA, Harvard University Press; London, William Heinemann Ltd. 1918. Online version at the Perseus Digital Library
 Pausanias, Graeciae Descriptio. 3 vols. Leipzig, Teubner. 1903.  Greek text available at the Perseus Digital Library.
 Pseudo-Apollodorus, The Library with an English Translation by Sir James George Frazer, F.B.A., F.R.S. in 2 Volumes, Cambridge, MA, Harvard University Press; London, William Heinemann Ltd. 1921. Online version at the Perseus Digital Library. Greek text available from the same website.

Women in Greek mythology